Ihor Borysyk (born June 2, 1984) is a retired Ukrainian swimmer. He was born in Simferopol. 

At the 2009 Ukraine National Cup, he swam a time of 58.67 seconds in a 100-meter breaststroke time-trial, a result that was under the world record at the time. However, it was denied world record status by FINA, as adequate doping control was not performed on Borysyk the day of the swim.

References

External links
BEST sports – Profile

1984 births
Living people
Sportspeople from Simferopol
Ukrainian male swimmers
Male breaststroke swimmers
Olympic swimmers of Ukraine
Swimmers at the 2008 Summer Olympics
Swimmers at the 2012 Summer Olympics
Medalists at the FINA World Swimming Championships (25 m)
Universiade medalists in swimming
Universiade gold medalists for Ukraine
Medalists at the 2009 Summer Universiade
21st-century Ukrainian people